

History
In 1961 the Holy Order of MANS was organized initially as the non-sectarian Science of Man Church in San Francisco by Earl Wilbur Blighton. Classes and meetings on the Ancient Mystery Teachings were held by Blighton on a regular monthly basis and a church structure began to grow.

The founder, Earl Wilbur Blighton, a retired electrical engineer and minister, who used the honorific Rt. Rev. was also known as Master Paul or Father Paul. A number of his previous religious associations included the Roman Catholic Church, Spiritualism, New Thought and the Rosicrucian Order. The stated mission and purpose of the Holy Order of MANS was to guide all mankind and the churches of Christ to union with the Divine Self of God within, the Divine Spark. According to Blighton, the Christ is returning now. The Golden Force—the vibration of the atmosphere of the entire planet is rising, and this action will cause some reactions in those who do not know the God Self. A willing intellectual and emotional assent to religious doctrine was not enough. Full experiential knowledge (gnosis) of God beyond merely intuitive spiritual insight was true redemption. The principal means of effecting this was by the praxis of theurgy and bhakti.

Interest in the classes grew, and in 1968 Dr. Blighton and his wife Helen Blighton, known as Mother Ruth, established a monastic seminary with a specific curriculum, incorporated in California, which was named the Holy Order of MANS (HOOM). It continued to be non-sectarian, and not affiliated with any religion. It became an international organization with Order Houses of members in almost every state of the United States and several were abroad. "MANS" standing for Mysterian, Agape, Nous, and Sophia in Greek, or mystery, love, mind, and wisdom in English.

The Holy Order of MANS was a religious order grounded in what it viewed as the esoteric teachings of "The Great Christ" through "The Master Jesus", which identifies it as New Age. The order was founded in the 1960s "in the culturally innovative milieu of San Francisco", USA. The Order has been described as "apostolic catholic", and some used the term "Pauline catholic or Paulean catholic", in its claim of possessing received esoteric apostolic doctrine without the necessity of canonical ordination in the line of Orthodox Catholic apostolic succession.

Father Paul died in 1974, and the Order continued to function until the mid-1980’s.

Ella Hoffman Rigney joined the Order in 1975. An accomplished philanthropist, fundraiser, and volunteer, she had taken hold of the struggling American Cancer Society in 1927 and turned it into an educational and fundraising juggernaut by the time she retired in 1957. Her second career was building the Raphael House homeless family shelter in San Francisco which exists today. Mrs. Rigney was intrigued by the first Raphael House,located on Gough and McAllister Streets in San Francisco and started by the Holy Order of MANS, a non-sectarian group of volunteers dedicated to service to the community. The first iteration of Raphael House served homeless women and children. Inspired by their work in the community, Ella joined the Holy Order of MANS at the age of 82, taking life vows at the age of 83. Ella retained her membership at St. Mary the Virgin Episcopal Church in San Francisco. Recognizing there was no homeless shelter for whole families in Northern California before Raphael House, she said, “I felt we had to do something to keep families together to help them as a whole.” Her vision was to build a social service agency that she and other volunteers from the Order would be willing to live in, which she did. Ella led 47 Order members in building a “working household” where families ate and lived together as a community. Needing more space to house families together, they moved to our current location at 1065 Sutter Street, formerly a private hospital.

Beginning in 1984, HOOM gradually changed, through adoption of spiritual practices common in Orthodox Christianity, which prompted the departure of most members. Father Andrew Rossi became Blighton's successor. HOOM had become a more traditional Eastern Orthodox sect, renaming itself in 1988 "Christ the Savior Brotherhood" (CSB). The few remaining CSB members converted to a non-canonical form of orthodox Christianity and moved into a monastery associated with this group. Some members who left created organizations based on the Order and its initiations. During that time the Science of Man Church (SOM) was reactivated by Mother Ruth and attracted a small number of Order members. SOM has a website called ScienceofMan.org where Order books are sold. By 1988 the HOOM structure had changed into an Orthodox Christian organization. The name Holy Order of MANS, its curriculum, and its initiations were discontinued. Over time the Orthodox Christian organization ceased to function and then dissolved its corporate structure.

In 1988, the remaining members and hierarchy of the HOOM joined the Eastern Orthodox Church under the new name Christ the Savior Brotherhood (abbreviated CSB). While the leader of the archdiocese which CSB joined does not belong to the Standing Conference of the Canonical Orthodox Bishops in the Americas, Rossi argued that "doesn't mean that CSB has not moved into Christian orthodoxy". Under the terms of the merger, the group continued to have a great deal of autonomy. Members who took second vows within the group still wore robes and clerical collars. Legal ownership of HOOM property and assets was retained by the CSB but remained incorporated under the name Holy Order of MANS. In 1988, the HOOM curriculum was discontinued.

In 1991, Rossi resigned as director-general of the CSB under pressure from the hierarchy within the brotherhood. The CSB agreed, under the terms of his resignation, to fund the departure of Rossi and his family. He travelled to England with sufficient CSB financial support to pursue a doctoral degree in Orthodox studies at the University of Oxford under Kallistos Ware. During the 1990s to about 2000, a few members of the CSB individually joined canonical jurisdictions of the Orthodox Church. In 1992 Orthodox church leaders said the Christ the Savior Brotherhood had dwindled to about 500 members. In 2000, after removing itself from non-canonical autocephalous Orthodox affiliation, the CSB with its people, parishes and monasteries, having aligned itself with mainline Orthodox doctrine and practice, was fully received into canonical Orthodox jurisdictions. In 2002 the CSB officially changed its corporation name from Holy Order of MANS to Christ the Saviour Brotherhood, and changed its by-laws to newly worded corporate by-laws that reflect orthodoxy.

Many former members of the original Holy Order of MANS, who had departed in the 1980s and had not become Orthodox Christian or associated with the CSB, preserved the original teachings and practices of the Order and made them available through development of internet sites and teaching classes in person throughout the United States.  Since 1988 the HOOM curriculum was followed in many groups formed by members who had left the CSB, including the Science of Man in Oregon, which was led by Blighton's wife, Mother Ruth, until her death in 2005, and the Gnostic Order of Christ, founded by HOOM "Master Timothy" Delbert Harris.

In February 2012 the Holy Order of MANS was incorporated in the State of California as a religious non-profit in California and maintains two websites where the original Order curriculum of study, a calendar of classes, including on Zoom, and events, and literature for sale may be found. The Order was assisted in its corporate filing at the California Secretary of State’s Business Programs by Ernesto Resurreccion, Corporate Documents Examiner. The Order continues to actively teach the original Order curriculum on the website HolyOrderofMANS.org, in person, on Zoom and on the website HolyOrderofMANS.com. Order books are now available for sale by the Holy Order of MANS through Amazon. The Holy Sacraments, Vows,Initiations of Baptism, Illumination, Self-Realization, Ordination of Priests, and Master Teachers with the Power to Ordain are performed by the Holy Order of MANS. Over the years former Order members have continued the work of the Order in locations across America.

Scholarship
As Sarah A. Riccardi-Swartz explains, "very little is written" about the order, though it has been written up in a few studies of new age religions. The one monograph on the order which was available by the time of Ricccardi-Swartz's study is Philip Lucas's 'The Odyssey of a New Religion: The Holy Order of MANS From New Age to Orthodoxy'' (Indiana UP, 1995).

References 
 
www.holyorderofmans.com
www.holyorderofmans.org
Dr. Earl W. Blighton's 'The Golden Force' (Holy Order of MANS, 2021, available on Amazon)

Works cited

Mans
Esoteric Christianity
New Age
Christian new religious movements
1960s establishments in California